Rajanikanta Sen, also known as Kantakobi, (26 July 1865 – 13 September 1910) was a Bengali poet and composer, known for his devotional (bhakti) compositions, as well as his patriotic songs.

Early life, education and profession

Rajanikanta was born in a Vaidya family in the village of Bhangabari, Sirajganj of Pabna district,presently situated at Bangladesh. He was the third child of Guruprasad Sen and Manomohini Debi. Rajanikanta's sister Ambuja Sundari Dasgupta was a renowned poet too.

Originally, his ancestors hailed from Sahadevpur village under Tangail Subdivision of Mymensingh District on right side of Brahmaputra in Bangladesh. When Rajanikanta's great grand father Jogiram died, his pregnant wife Karunamoyee came to his Brother's residence at Bhangabari village and gave birth to Golaknath, grand father of Rajanikanta. Though Golaknath was deprived of higher education due to financial constraints, he imparted best of education to his two sons, Govindanath and Guruprasad. Govindanath practiced law in the court of Rajshahi in Bangladesh. Guruprasad, father of Rajanikanta, passed LLB from Dacca university and became a sub-judge. He served as sub-judge in many parts of Bengal, such as Rangpur, Dinajpur, Bhagalpur, Munger, Kalna, and Katwa, and finally came to Krishnanagar and retired.Guruprasad was posted in Katwa when Rajanikanta was born.

Rajanikanta started his schooling at Boalia Zilla School (now Rajshahi Collegiate School). He learned Sanskrit from Rajnath Tarkaratna, a neighbour in his village Bhangakuthi during school vacations. He got Gopal Chandra Lahiri as his academic mentor. In 1882 he passed Entrance Examination from Coochbihar Jenkins School. Other claims such as he was from Koochbihar are of no substance. Then he came to Calcutta and passed FA in 1885 with second division. He completed BA degree in 1889 and BL degree in 1891 from Kolkata City College. He too then started practicing law in Rajshahi where Govindanath was practicing. Rajanikanta earned reputation quickly. However, his passion lay in cultural activities like music, literature, acting in plays etc. In this endeavor he received support from his friends such as historian Akshay Kumar Maitreya, and also from his wife. He worked as a Munsif for some days in Natore and Naogaon.

Orientation towards Music 
Rajanikanta's father Guruprasad was inclined to poetry and music, and was a composer of Vaishnab and Shiva-Durga songs (Padabali). Guruprasad collected age old Vaishnava lyrics in Brajabuli dialect from Katwa-Kalna area and compiled them into a book titled Padachintamanimala. His mother Manomohini Devi had interest in Bengali literature. She used to discuss it with young Rajanikanta. All these influenced his future compositions a lot. Sen got interested in music from Tarakeshwar Chakrabarty, his friend in Bhangabari. He was fluent in writing poems in Bengali and Sanskrit from childhood. He started composing music for his poems and singing those along with playing musical instruments later. Rajanikanta's poems were published in various local magazines such as Utsaha, Ashalata etc. He used to compose songs for inaugural and closing ceremonies for various assemblies in his college days even in very short notice.

One such song is stated below, which Rajanikanta composed within a very short period of one hour for such an assembly in Rajshahi library:

Personal life 

After the voluntary retirement of his father the family of Rajanikanta became financially dependent on Guruprasad's elder brother's sons Barada Gobinda and Kali Kumar. Both of them died suddenly in quick succession in 1878. Rajani's younger brother Janakikanta had also just died of hydrophobia. Suddenly the prosperous family plunged into a financial crisis. Rajanikanta had to study and practice law to support the family. However, he expressed his dislikes towards the profession in a letter written to Sri Sarat Kumar Ray. He married Hiranmayee Devi in 1883, who used to discuss with and encouraged Rajanikanta regarding his poetry and sometimes suggested themes for the poems. They had four sons – Shachindra, Gnanendra, Bhupendra, Kshitindra; and two daughters - Shatadalbasini and Shantibala. Bhupendra died at a young age. Rajani's firm belief in God is reflected in the following song composed on the next day:

Contribution to Bengali music and literature 
Rajanikanta's songs may be classified into four categories:
Devotional (ভক্তি মূলক), Patriotic (দেশাত্মবোধক), Humanitarian (মানবধর্মী) and Satire (হাস্যরসাত্মক).

There was an assembly in Calcutta town hall on 7 August 1905 for protesting against Partition of Bengal. The boycott of British goods and using Swadeshi (Indian) items were decided by eminent Bengali leaders. Indian common men started using clothes manufactured in India. However, those were not so fine as compared to British ones. This made some of the Indians unhappy. In this context Rajanikanta wrote his famous song:

The song became popular across entire Bengal and so was Sen. The song was a major source of inspiration for the participants of the contemporary Swadeshi movement as well as for the Indian freedom fighters in the years to come. He wrote another popular song with similar intention:

Three books written by Rajanikanta were published in his life time; they were Bani (বাণী) (1902), Kalyani (কল্যাণী) (1905) and Amrita (অমৃত) (1910). Durgadas Lahiri in his encyclopedia of Bengali songs (বাঙালির গান), published in 1905, mentioned about Rajanikanta Sen: 

After his demise five compilations of his creations were published, they were  Avoya (অভয়া) (1910), Anandamayi (আনন্দময়ী) (1910), Bishram (বিশ্রাম) (1910), Sadbhabkusum (সদ্ভাবকুসুম) (1913) and Shesdan ( শেষদান) (1916). Vani and Kalyani are collections of his songs. Amrita contains short poems to inculcate the right values in children. Rabindranath Tagore's Kanika influenced him to compose these poems. He started composing satirical songs being  influenced by poet Dwijendralal Ray, who was befreiended with him during Ray's visit to Rajshahi.

Sen's major contribution towards Bengali literature and music was the immortal devotional songs which were written and composed by him. His songs were set to Hindustani classical style, mixing Kirtan, Baul and Tappa. He became well known as Kantakabi and his songs are often called Kantageeti.

Rajanikanta's's songs in Bengali films

Contribution to Indian freedom movement 
Indian National Movement, the Swadeshi movement in particular, greatly influenced contemporary literature. Eminent poets including Rabindranath Tagore, Dwijendralal Roy, Debabrata Basu, Satyendranath Dutta, Atul Prasad Sen and Rajanikanta's contribution  came through their patriotic poems and songs, and widely acknowledged with reverence.
Rajanikanta was very close to Jaladhar Sen. One of such many incidences was cited by Jaladhar Sen himself:  The song was "মায়ের দেওয়া মোটা কাপড় মাথায় তুলে নে রে ভাই" (Mayer deoa mota kapor mathay tule ne re bhai).

Last days 

In 1909, Rajanikanta started suffering from throat problems. On 10 September, he was forced to move to Calcutta along with some family members. A British doctor examined him and diagnosed it as Larynx cancer. He consulted various doctors in Calcutta but his condition did not improve. As a last resort, he spent a couple of months in Varanasi with the hope of divine intervention. He had to sell off copyrights of his published books Vani and Kalyani to arrange for the trip. He had to return to Calcutta as his condition had worsened much. He underwent Tracheotomy operation by Captain Denham White on 10 February 1910 in Calcutta Medical College. He survived the operation but lost his voice forever. He spent the remaining days of his life in the cottage ward of the hospital (Cottage no. 12). It is noteworthy to mention that Hemendranath Bakshi and Bijitendra Nath Basu, students of 4th year, took personal initiative to attend and impart all medical assistance to the poet till his last breath. Dr. Mathura Mohan Bhattacharya, and Dr. Girish Chandra Maitra was in charge of his treatment. Rajanikanta used to write in his diary quite regularly during his stay in the hospital. He also started writing an autobiography which was written only up to the first chapter. Some poetry lovers and some of the students of the Calcutta Medical College tended after him, Maharaja Manindra Chandra Nandi and Sharat Kumar Ray, son of Pramathanath Ray, Zamindar of Dighapatiya, Natore, helped him financially. On 11 June 1910 Rabindranath Tagore visited the hospital to meet Sen. Sen's son Kshitindranath and daughter Shantibala sung a song composed by him and he accompanied by playing harmonium.  This is reflected in the following song composed on the day Rabindranath met him:

As gratitude towards Tagore's for visit in the hospital, Rajanikanta wrote a letter and another poem, "এই মুক্ত প্রাণের দৃপ্ত বাসনা তৃপ্ত করিবে কে ", and sent to Bolpur. Tagore wrote a letter to him on 30 July. In this, he appreciated Sen for his literary talent. During this period, he also composed a few Agamani-Vijaya songs. He died on 13 September 1910 in Kolkata.

Legacy
Many singers from Bengal, India and Bangladesh have recorded his songs through ages. They include Indubala Devi, K L Saigal, Juthika Roy, Pannalal Bhattacharya, Dilip Kumar Roy, Chhabi Bandyopadhyay, Hemanta Mukhopadhyay, Sandhya Mukhopadhyay, Krishna Chattopadhyay, Neela Majumdar, Dilip Kumar Roy (grandson of Rajanikanta Sen), Anup Ghoshal, Nishith Sadhu, Nupurchanda Ghosh, Arghya Sen, Juthika Roy, Aarti Mukherji, Manna Dey, Manabendra Mukhopadhyay, Iffat Ara Dewan and Utpala Sen, and many others.
A statute of Rajanikanta Sen has been placed in Hedua Park, Kolkata.
A public library, "Kabi Rajanikanta Smriti Songsod O Pathagar", is proposed to be constructed in the Bhangabari Village, Benkuchi, Sirajgaunj, Bangladesh, commemorating birthplace of Rajanikanta Sen.

Bibliography
Sahitya Sangsad. Rajanikanta Kabyo Guchho.
Manoranjan Sen (1972). Kanto Geeti Malya, Calcutta.
Riddhi Bandopadhyay (2016). Rajanikanta, Patra Bharati.
Rajanikanta Sen (1905). Kalyani (কল্যাণী) 
Rajanikanta Sen (1902). Bani (বাণী) 
Pandit, Nalini Ranjan (1921). Kanta Kabi Rajanikanta,Bengal Book Company, Calcutta

References

1865 births
1910 deaths
People from Pabna District
Indian composers
Indian male composers
Bengali-language lyricists
Indian lyricists
Indian songwriters
19th-century Indian male classical singers
City College, Kolkata alumni
University of Calcutta alumni
19th-century Indian composers
Bengali singers
Writers from Kolkata
Musicians from West Bengal
Bengali poets
19th-century Bengali poets
Bengali male poets
Indian musicians
Indian male musicians
19th-century Indian musicians
Indian male writers
Indian poets
Indian male poets
19th-century Indian male writers
19th-century Indian poets
19th-century Indian writers
Indian male singers
Indian singers
19th-century Indian singers
People from Sirajganj District